In mathematics, specifically algebraic geometry, the valuative criteria are a collection of results that make it possible to decide whether a morphism of algebraic varieties, or more generally schemes, is universally closed, separated, or proper.

Statement of the valuative criteria 
Recall that a valuation ring A is a domain, so if K is the field of fractions of A, then Spec K is the generic point of Spec A.

Let X and Y be schemes, and let f : X → Y be a morphism of schemes. Then the following are equivalent:
f is separated (resp. universally closed, resp. proper)
f is quasi-separated (resp. quasi-compact, resp. of finite type and quasi-separated) and for every valuation ring A, if Y'  = Spec A and X'  denotes the generic point of Y' , then for every morphism Y'  → Y and every morphism X'  → X which lifts the generic point, then there exists at most one (resp. at least one, resp. exactly one) lift Y'  → X.

The lifting condition is equivalent to specifying that the natural morphism

is injective (resp. surjective, resp. bijective).

Furthermore, in the special case when Y is (locally) noetherian, it suffices to check the case that A is a discrete valuation ring.

References 

Algebraic geometry
Scheme theory